Krigia montana, known as mountain dwarfdandelion, is a North American species of plants in the family Asteraceae. It is native to the Great Smoky Mountains and other nearby peaks in the southern Appalachians of Tennessee, the Carolinas, and Georgia. It is found on cliffs and outcrops at high elevations.

Krigia montana is a perennial herb up to 50 cm (20 inches) tall. One plant can produce 20 or more flower heads, each head with 25–60 yellow ray flowers but no disc flowers.

References

Cichorieae
Flora of the Appalachian Mountains
Endemic flora of the United States
Plants described in 1803
Taxa named by André Michaux
Taxa named by Thomas Nuttall